The Fearmakers is a 1958 American film noir crime film directed by Jacques Tourneur and starring Dana Andrews. The screenplay is based on the 1945 novel of the same name by Darwin Teilhet. The film centers on seemingly nonpartisan political messages that are shaped by a public-relations firm secretly controlled by communists determined to undermine the American government.

Plot
Korean War veteran Alan Eaton, who suffered through brainwashing as a P.O.W., returns home and resumes his job at a public-relation and opinion-research firm in Washington, D.C. His partner has been killed mysteriously in an accident, and he discovers that his company has been taken over by communist infiltrators intent on fixing public opinion polls and promoting communist organizations. To stop them, Eaton cooperates with a Senate investigation.

Cast
 Dana Andrews as Alan Eaton
 Dick Foran as Jim McGinnis
 Marilee Earle as Lorraine Dennis
 Veda Ann Borg as Vivian Loder
 Kelly Thordsen as Harold 'Hal' Loder
 Roy Gordon as Sen. Walder
 Joel Marston as Rodney Hillyer
 Dennis Moore as Army Doctor
 Oliver Blake as Dr. Gregory Jessup
 Janet Brandt as Walder's Secretary
 Fran Andrade as TWA Stewardess
 Mel Tormé as Barney Bond (as Mel Torme)

See also
 List of American films of 1958

References

External links
 
 
 
 

1958 films
Film noir
1950s psychological thriller films
1950s English-language films
American black-and-white films
American political thriller films
Films critical of communism
American anti-communist propaganda films
Cold War films
Films directed by Jacques Tourneur
United Artists films
Fiction about mind control
1950s American films